Stroud House may refer to:

Stroud House (Bentonville, Arkansas), listed on the NRHP in Arkansas
Stroud House (Rogers, Arkansas), listed on the NRHP in Arkansas
James W. Stroud House, Stroud, Oklahoma, listed on the NRHP in Oklahoma
Stroud Mansion, Stroudsburg, Pennsylvania, listed on the NRHP in Pennsylvania
Stroud House (Stroud, New South Wales), Stroud, New South Wales listed on the State Heritage Register